Yannis Varveris (1955 – 25 May 2011) was a Greek poet, critic and translator.

Varveris was born and died in Athens.  He read Law at the University of Athens. His first collection of poems was published in 1975. He belongs to the so-called Genia tou 70, which is a literary term referring to Greek authors who began publishing their work during the 1970s, especially towards the end of the Greek military junta of 1967-1974 and at the first years of the Metapolitefsi. He has been awarded the State Book Prize for Criticism in 1996 for his book  (1976–1984) and the Cavafy prize (2001) and the poetry prize of literary journal Diavazo (2002) for his poetry collection .

Works

Poetry
 (In Imagination and Word), 1975
 (The Beak), 1978
 (Disabled Veterans), 1982
 (Death Spread It Around), 1986
 (Piano of the Deep), 1991
 (Mister Fog), 1993
 (Miracle Null and Void), 1996
 1975-1996 (Poems 1975-1996), 2000
 (Abroad), 2001
 (Wasted money), 2005
 (The man alone), 2009
 (Of old age), 2011

Selected essays and criticism
 (1976–1984) (Theater Reviews 1, 1976–1984), 1985
 (1976–1984) (Theater Reviews 2, 1976–1984), 1991
 (1976–1984) (Theater Reviews 3, 1976–1984), 1995
 (Lifeboat), 1999
 1994-2003 (Theater Reviews 4, 1994–2003), 2004

Notes

External links
His entry for the 2001 Frankfurt Book Fair (Greek)
His page at the website of the Hellenic Authors' Society (Greek) and (English)
A page at the National Book Centre of Greece

1955 births
2011 deaths
Writers from Athens
National and Kapodistrian University of Athens alumni
21st-century Greek poets
20th-century Greek poets
Greek male poets
20th-century Greek male writers
21st-century Greek male writers